Malaysia is one of more than a hundred countries that have sent films to compete for the Academy Award for Best International Feature Film since 2004. The Academy Award for Best Foreign Language Film is handed out annually by the United States Academy of Motion Picture Arts and Sciences to a feature-length motion picture produced outside the United States that contains primarily non-English dialogue.

, a total of seven films have been submitted for the Academy Award for Best Foreign Language Film, but has yet to be received an Oscar nomination. The Princess of Mount Ledang was the first film to be submitted in 2003, since then no other films that was submitted until 2012, a film directed by Dain Said Bunohan was sent to compete, but it failed to set out as the nominee.

For the 88th Academy Awards, Men Who Save the World was decided by National Film Development Corporation Malaysia (FINAS) to be submitted, affiliated with Malaysian Ministry of Communications and Multimedia.

Submissions 
The Academy of Motion Picture Arts and Sciences has invited the film industries of various countries to submit their best film for the Academy Award for Best Foreign Language Film since 1956. The Foreign Language Film Award Committee oversees the process and reviews all the submitted films. Following this, they vote via secret ballot to determine the five nominees for the award. Below is a list of the films that have been submitted by Malaysia for review by the Academy for the award by year and the respective Academy Awards ceremony.

See also 
 Academy Award
 Academy Award for Best Foreign Language Film
 List of Academy Award-winning foreign language films
 List of Academy Award winners and nominees for Best Foreign Language Film
 List of countries by number of Academy Awards for Best Foreign Language Film

Notes

References

External links 
The Official Academy Awards Database
IMDb Academy Awards Page

Malaysia
Academy Award for Best Foreign Language Film, submissions for